Caramelman and Asian Kung-Fu Generation is an early EP album by Japanese rock band Asian Kung-Fu Generation, released during their indie days. The mini-album was a joint-work with Caramelman and composed almost entirely in English lyrics. The fourth track, "Aono Uta," was later re-recorded and included within the band's major-label debut EP, Hōkai Amplifier.

Track listing
"S.E. (Sexy Eddy)"
"There is no Hope"
"Love"

"Baby Sleep Tonight"

Personnel
Masafumi Gotō – lead vocals, guitar, lyrics
Kensuke Kita – lead guitar, background vocals
Takahiro Yamada –  bass, background vocals
Kiyoshi Ijichi – drums

Asian Kung-Fu Generation EPs
2000 EPs
Japanese-language EPs